Alcamarine (possibly from Aymara and Quechua allqamari "mountain caracara", -ni a suffix to indicate ownership, "the one with the mountain caracara") is a mountain in the Peruvian Andes, about  high. It is located in the Puno Region, Azángaro Province, on the border of the districts of Muñani and San Antón. It lies northwest of Surupana and north of Chamacane.

Alcamarine is situated at the Quellhuiri which originates northwest of the mountain. It flows to the south.

References

Mountains of Puno Region
Mountains of Peru